Hermine is a feminine form of Herman, consisting of the elements harja- "army" and mann- "man". 

It could also be a variant of the Greek name Hermione.

Hermine, Herminie, or Hermin may refer to:

People with the given name Hermine

Mononym 
 Archduchess Hermine of Austria (1817–1842), member of the House of Habsburg-Lorraine
 Princess Hermine of Anhalt-Bernburg-Schaumburg-Hoym (1797–1817), archduchess of Austria
 Princess Hermine of Waldeck and Pyrmont (1827–1910), German princess

B 
Hermine Bosetti (1875-1936), German coloratura soprano
Hermine Baron (1912–1996), American contract bridge player
Hermine “Herma” Bauma (1915–2003), Austrian athlete
Hermine Beckett-Hanna, who may have started National Grandparents Day
Hermine Berthold (1896–1990), German resistance activist during the Nazi years and politician
Hermine Boettcher-Brueckner (born 1918), Nazi SS auxiliary guard
Hermine Bosetti (1875–1936), German coloratura soprano
Hermine Braunsteiner (1919–1999), Nazi camp guard

C 
 Herminie Cadolle (1845–1926), inventor of the modern bra and founder of Cadolle house

D 
Hermine David (1886–1970), French painter and wife of Jules Pascin
Hermine de Clermont-Tonnerre, a celebrity who competed on La Ferme Célébrités
Hermine de Graaf (1951–2013), Dutch novelist
Hermine Demoriane (born 1942), French singer, writer and tightrope walker

F 
 Hermine Freed (1940–1998), American painter and video artist

H 
 Hermine Hartleben (1846–1919), German Egyptologist
 Hermine Haselböck (born 1967), Austrian mezzo-soprano in opera, concert and lied
 Hermine Horiot (born 1986), French cellist
 Hermine Hug-Hellmuth (1871–1924), Austrian psychoanalyst
 Hermine Huntgeburth (born 1957), German film director

J 
 Hermin Joseph (born 1964), Dominican sprinter

K 
Hermine Agavni Kalustyan (1914–1989), Armenian-Turkish mathematician, educator, and politician
Hermine Kittel (1879–1948), Austrian contralto
Hermine E. Kleinert (1880–1943), American painter and artist
Hermine Körner (1878–1960), German actress, director and theater manager
Hermine Küchenmeister-Rudersdorf (1822–1882), German singer, composer and voice teacher

N 
 Hermine Naghdalyan (born 1960), Armenian economist and politician

O 
 Hermine Overbeck-Rohte (1869–1937), German landscape painter

P 
 Hermine Pfleger (1884–1980), better known as Mia May, Austrian actress

R 
Hermine Reuss of Greiz (1887–1947), second wife of German Emperor William II
Hermine E. Ricketts (1956–2019), Jamaican-born American architect
Hermine Riss (1903–1980), Austrian Righteous among the Nations

S 
Hermine Santrouschitz (1909–2010), better known as Miep Gies, who hid the family of Anne Frank in her attic
Hermine Schröder (1911-1978), German track and field athlete
Hermine Stindt (1888–1974), German swimmer who competed in the 1912 Olympics
Hermine von Siegstädt (1844–1883), Austrian operatic soprano
Hermine Speier (1898–1989), German archaeologist
Hermine Spies (1857-1893), German concert and opera singer

W 
Hermine Waterneau (1862–1916), French painter

Places
Hermin, Pas-de-Calais, northern France
Herminie, Pennsylvania, United States
Sainte-Hermine, Vendée, western France

Ships
Grande Hermine, the ship believed to have brought Jacques Cartier to Saint-Pierre in 1535
Petite Hermine, another of Jacques Cartier's ships

Other
L'Hermine, a 2015 French film
Hermine, a fictional character in Herman Hesse's 1927 novel Steppenwolf
Herminie, scène lyrique (H.29), an 1828 cantata for mezzo-soprano and orchestra by French composer Hector Berlioz
Hurricane Hermine, a 2016 tropical cyclone that impacted the East Coast of the United States
Tropical Storm Hermine (disambiguation)

See also 
Ermine (disambiguation)
Hermione (disambiguation)

Armenian feminine given names
French feminine given names
German feminine given names